Olav Berntsen Oksvik (7 May 1887 – 16 September 1958) was a Norwegian politician for the Labour and Social Democratic Labour parties. He served as a member of the Parliament of Norway from 1928 until 1952 and then as the County Governor of Møre og Romsdal county from 1952 until his death in 1958.

In 1928 he helped launch the newspaper Romsdal Folkeblad. In January 1941 he was ordered by Nasjonal Samling to become mayor of the municipality of Bolsøy, which he categorically refused. He temporarily served as the acting Minister of Agriculture from 1947 to 1948 in place of Kristian Fjeld.

References

1887 births
1958 deaths
Government ministers of Norway
Members of the Storting
Labour Party (Norway) politicians
20th-century Norwegian politicians
County governors of Norway
People from Stranda